UPSC may refer to:

 Union Public Service Commission of India
 Urban Planning Society of China
 Uttarakhand Public Service Commission of Uttarakhand, India